Antti Ulmanen (born 17 May 1999) is a Finnish football player. He plays for JäPS.

Club career
He made his Veikkausliiga debut for HIFK on 21 June 2017 in a game against JJK.

On 10 January 2022, he signed with JäPS.

References

External links
 

1999 births
Living people
Finnish footballers
Finland youth international footballers
Association football forwards
Klubi 04 players
HIFK Fotboll players
IF Gnistan players
Ekenäs IF players
Mikkelin Palloilijat players
Järvenpään Palloseura players
Veikkausliiga players
Ykkönen players
Kakkonen players